This is a list of years in Poland. See also the timeline of Polish history.  For only articles about years in Poland that have been written, see :Category:Years in Poland.

Twenty-first century

Twentieth century

Nineteenth century

Eighteenth century

Seventeenth century

See also 
 Timeline of Polish history

 
Poland history-related lists
Poland